Ark 2 may refer to:

 Ark 2 (album), a 1969 album released by Flaming Youth
 Ark II, an American television series
 Ark Two Shelter, a nuclear fallout shelter near Toronto, Ontario, Canada
 Ark 2 (video game), the announced possible sequel to the Ark: Survival Evolved video game